Ophthalmis is a genus of moths of the family Noctuidae. The genus was erected by Jacob Hübner in 1819.

Species
 Ophthalmis cincta Boisduval, 1874
 Ophthalmis darna H. Druce, 1894
 Ophthalmis floresiana Rothschild, 1897
 Ophthalmis haemorrhoidalis Guérin-Méneville, [1838]
 Ophthalmis lincea Cramer, [1779]
 Ophthalmis milete Cramer, [1775]
 Ophthalmis privata Walker, [1865]
 Ophthalmis swinhoei Semper, 1899

References

Agaristinae